Wera Benedicta Hobhouse ( von Reden; born 8 February 1960) is a German-British politician. A member of the Liberal Democrats, Hobhouse has been Member of Parliament (MP) for Bath since 2017 and serves as the Liberal Democrat Shadow Leader of the House of Commons and the Liberal Democrat Spokesperson for Energy and Climate Change and Transport under Ed Davey.

Hobhouse served under Tim Farron and Vince Cable as Spokesperson for Communities and Local Government from 2017 to 2019. She served under Jo Swinson as Liberal Democrat Spokesperson for Environment, Food and Rural Affairs and Transport from 2019 to 2020. She was the Liberal Democrat Spokesperson for Energy and Climate Change from February 2019 to August 2019 and again from January 2020 to September 2020.

Early life and career
Wera Benedicta Hobhouse was born on 8 February 1960 in Hanover, Germany. She studied history and fine art at the University of Münster and afterwards studied art for two years at the École des Beaux Arts in Paris. She then moved back to Germany, completing a master's degree in history and fine art at the Free University of Berlin. She married William Hobhouse in 1989 and moved to England the following year. They first lived in Liverpool, where Wera Hobhouse opened an art gallery on Falkner Street. They moved to Rochdale in 1999. Prior to her political career, she was a teacher, radio journalist and artist.

Hobhouse was first elected in 2004 as a Conservative councillor for the ward of Norden on Rochdale Council, Greater Manchester. Her political career in Rochdale was defined by the Spodden Valley asbestos controversy; the proposed development of 650 homes on an asbestos-contaminated site. Hobhouse and her husband opposed the proposals, leading them to defect to the Liberal Democrats in 2005. They were criticised at the time for not triggering by-elections to seek fresh mandates as Liberal Democrat councillors. The development was successfully blocked in 2011.

Hobhouse was re-elected in 2006 and 2010 for the Liberal Democrats in Norden. The Liberal Democrats assumed majority control of Rochdale Council in 2007; Hobhouse served as the cabinet member for the environment between 2006 and 2009 and chaired the health scrutiny committee from 2009 to 2010. After the Liberal Democrats lost majority control of the council in 2010, Hobhouse was elected as the leader of the much-reduced Liberal Democrat group on Rochdale Council in May 2011. In July 2011, Hobhouse accused a council officer of failing to act impartially but later apologised after the council officer began legal action for defamation.

Hobhouse unsuccessfully contested the constituency of Heywood and Middleton in the 2010 general election. In 2014, she retired as a councillor for Norden and moved to Bath. In the local elections of May 2015 she stood unsuccessfully for election to the Bath and North East Somerset Council in the Peasedown ward. On the same day, she contested North East Somerset at the 2015 election, again unsuccessfully.

Parliamentary career

For the 2017 general election, Hobhouse was selected to stand for parliament in Bath. The constituency was held by the Conservative MP Ben Howlett, and had previously been held by the Liberal Democrat Don Foster from 1992 to 2015. Hobhouse stood on a pro-European platform which emphasised housing, education, congestion and pollution concerns, as well as opposition to the incumbent Conservative MP's plans to link the A46 and A36 roads together. Her party emphasised the need for Labour supporters to vote tactically for Hobhouse to defeat the Conservatives. Hobhouse gained the seat with a majority of 5,694 votes and a 17.6% increase in the Liberal Democrat vote share, the second-highest vote share increase for the party nationally.

Following her election, Hobhouse was appointed as the Liberal Democrat spokesperson for housing, communities and local government. She made her maiden speech on 29 June 2017, and sits on the Committee on Exiting the European Union.

On 6 March 2018, Hobhouse presented a Private Members' Bill to amend the Sexual Offences Act 2003; her bill aimed to outlaw acts of voyeurism, especially upskirting, which were not then explicitly covered by UK law. Justice Secretary David Gauke signalled that the government would support Hobhouse's bill, which was later supported by the Prime Minister, Theresa May. Hobhouse's bill was not debated at its presentation in the House of Commons. At its second reading in the Commons on 15 June 2018, Conservative MP Christopher Chope objected to Hobhouse's bill, preventing its passage through the Commons.  May also expressed her disappointment at the objection. Following his objection, the government reaffirmed its commitment to introduce legislation to outlaw upskirting. A government bill to outlaw upskirting was introduced to the House of Commons on 21 June 2018; and passed its second reading on 3 July 2018 to become the Voyeurism (Offences) Act 2019.

In an interview with HuffPost UK published in May 2018, Hobhouse warned against what she described as a "toxic" immigration debate in the UK. She acknowledged her party's limited resources following its electoral collapse at the 2015 general election, and affirmed that she was happy with Vince Cable as the party's leader. She urged the party to do more to increase its diversity. In July 2018, Hobhouse was criticised for claiming £4,800 in parliamentary expenses for a heavy duty colour printer. Defending her actions, Hobhouse said that she had saved the taxpayer £40,000 by taking over the lease from Bath's previous MP and that she required the printer for her constituency letters. In October 2018, Hobhouse's constituency office announced that it had completed 6,000 pieces of casework.

In February 2019, Hobhouse was made the Liberal Democrat spokesperson for the environment and climate change. In this capacity, Hobhouse pushed for an end to most carbon emissions by 2030, and for net-zero carbon emissions to be achieved by 2045 at the latest. This became the policy position of the Liberal Democrats at their conference in September 2019, where Hobhouse gave a keynote speech on tackling the climate crisis. Among the proposals that she has promoted to meet these targets, Hobhouse has called for a permanent ban on fracking, for increased investment in renewable energy, for greater powers to be given to local authorities to cut emissions, and for all airport expansion to be halted until a replacement can be found for jet fuel.

In February 2020, Hobhouse announced that she would be a candidate in the 2020 Liberal Democrats leadership election, before withdrawing in June and endorsing Layla Moran.

Hobhouse is a former member of the governing council of the Electoral Reform Society. She supports proportional representation for UK elections and claims that the coalition government's failure to secure electoral reform was its "biggest disappointment".

Hobhouse supports abortion reform in Northern Ireland, and has supported a campaign to improve the treatment of eating disorders, including by leading a parliamentary debate on destigmatising them. In local politics, she launched a petition to fund a large police station for the city.

In May 2021, alongside celebrities and other public figures, Hobhouse was a signatory to an open letter from Stylist magazine which called on the government to address what it described as an "epidemic of male violence" by funding an "ongoing, high-profile, expert-informed awareness campaign on men's violence against women and girls".

Personal life
Hobhouse has been married to the businessman William Hobhouse since 1989. They both cite the fall of the Berlin Wall as a pivotal moment in their lives, which they witnessed when they lived in Germany. They have four children, two sons and two daughters. She naturalised as a British citizen in 2007.

Hobhouse is a Christian. Although her mother and grandmother identified as Christians, her great-grandfather was Jewish; which meant that her family was persecuted under the Nuremberg Laws. Hobhouse is fluent in English, German and French. She cites Barack Obama and William Wilberforce as her political idols.

References

External links

1960 births
Living people
UK MPs 2017–2019
Liberal Democrats (UK) MPs for English constituencies
Conservative Party (UK) councillors
Politics of Bath, Somerset
Female members of the Parliament of the United Kingdom for English constituencies
Councillors in Greater Manchester
Liberal Democrats (UK) councillors
Politicians from Hanover
21st-century British women politicians
German emigrants to England
British people of German-Jewish descent
British Christians
UK MPs 2019–present
21st-century English women
21st-century English people
Women councillors in England
University of Münster alumni
Free University of Berlin alumni